Bobby Clement is a Nigerian footballer who plays as a forward for  club Shabab Sahel.

Club career
Clement started his youth career at Shooting Stars. In 2014, he signed a four-year-contract with Heartland, where he played for one season before moving to Enugu Rangers.

On 8 September 2017, Clement join Kuwaiti club Al-Arabi. He returned to Enugu Rangers in November 2018. In August 2022, Clement moved back to the Middle East, signing for Lebanese Premier League side Shabab Sahel.

Honours
Enugu Rangers
 Nigeria Premier League: 2016
 Nigerian FA Cup: 2018

Individual 
 Kuwait Crown Prince Cup top goalscorer: 2017–18 (6 goals)

References

External links
 
 

1998 births
Living people
Residents of Lagos
Nigerian footballers
Association football forwards
Shooting Stars S.C. players
Heartland F.C. players
Rangers International F.C. players
Al-Arabi SC (Kuwait) players
Al-Fahaheel FC players
Rivers United F.C. players
Nigeria Professional Football League players
Kuwait Premier League players
Lebanese Premier League players
Nigerian expatriate footballers
Nigerian expatriate sportspeople in Kuwait
Nigerian expatriate sportspeople in Lebanon
Expatriate footballers in Kuwait
Expatriate footballers in Lebanon